The Chuck Dukowski Sextet (or CD6) is a band featuring former Black Flag bassist Chuck Dukowski. The band is called a sextet even though they only have four members.

History
Dukowski wanted to start playing again so he began playing with a drummer in December 2012. He invited his wife, Lora Norton, to contribute vocals and after a few years his step-son Milo Gonzalez joined as guitarist at the age of sixteen.

Dukowski has said that CD6 is the most collaborative band he has been in since Würm with each member having a say in songwriting although Lora handles the lyric writing.

The band's first album, Eat My Life, was released on Dukowski's own label Nice & Friendly Records. A second album, Reverse the Polarity, was also released on Nice & Friendly Records. In 2010, Jeff Bowers of ORG Music persuaded the band to join his label. After joining, CD6 released a split 7-inch with Mike Watt + The Missingmen. A third album, Haunted, was released on ORG.

Discography
Eat My Life (2006)
Reverse the Polarity (2007)
Haunted (2012)

References

Musical groups from Los Angeles
Psychedelic rock music groups from California
Musical groups established in 2002